Jessamine County is a county located in the U.S. state of Kentucky. As of the 2020 census, the population was 52,991. Its county seat is Nicholasville. The county was founded in December 1798. Jessamine County is part of the Lexington-Fayette, KY Metropolitan Statistical Area. It is within the Inner Blue Grass region, long a center of farming and blooded stock raising, including thoroughbred horses. The legislature established a commercial wine industry here in the late 18th century.

History
Jessamine County was established in 1798 from land given by Fayette County. Jessamine was the 36th Kentucky county in order of formation. The county is claimed to be named for a Jessamine Douglass, the daughter of a pioneer settler, who was either killed by Native Americans or committed suicide after being unlucky in love, but that story is dismissed by modern scholars, who say the name is from Jessamine Creek and the jasmine flowers that grow next to it. Most of the early pioneers were from Virginia, who came through the mountains after the American Revolutionary War.

In the late 18th century, the Kentucky General Assembly passed a bill to establish a commercial vineyard and winery, based in Nicholasville and the first in the United States, known as First Vineyard. Wine making based on European grapes became widespread in the United States. After the Prohibition era, which lasted from 1920 to 1933, the county voted to prohibit alcohol sales. Voters in the city of Nicholasville allowed package alcohol sales. The Chrisman Mill Vineyards is authorized to operate and sell its product in the "dry" portion of the county.

Geography

The county's entire southern border is formed by the Kentucky River.

Adjacent counties
 Fayette County  (northeast)
 Madison County  (southeast)
 Garrard County  (south)
 Mercer County  (southwest)
 Woodford County  (northwest)

Demographics

As of the census of 2000, there were 39,041 people, 13,867 households, and 10,663 families residing in the county. The racial makeup of the county was 94.44% White, 3.13% Black or African American, 0.20% Native American, 0.58% Asian, 0.03% Pacific Islander, 0.47% from other races, and 1.14% from two or more races.  1.31% of the population were Hispanic or Latino of any race.

There were 13,867 households, out of which 38.80% had children under the age of 18 living with them, 61.90% were married couples living together, 11.10% had a female householder with no husband present, and 23.10% were non-families. 18.50% of all households were made up of individuals, and 6.50% had someone living alone who was 65 years of age or older.  The average household size was 2.69 and the average family size was 3.05.

The age distribution was 26.40% under the age of 18, 11.60% from 18 to 24, 31.10% from 25 to 44, 21.40% from 45 to 64, and 9.50% who were 65 years of age or older.  The median age was 33 years. For every 100 females, there were 96.60 males.  For every 100 females age 18 and over, there were 92.80 males.

The median income for a household in the county was $40,096, and the median income for a family was $46,152. Males had a median income of $32,340 versus $23,771 for females. The per capita income for the county was $18,842.  About 8.40% of families and 10.50% of the population were below the poverty line, including 13.70% of those under age 18 and 9.90% of those age 65 or over.

Transportation
The Lexington Area MPO is responsible for transportation planning for Fayette and Jessamine counties.  This includes activities such as carpool matching, administering a commuter vanpool program, air quality forecasting, bicycle and pedestrian planning, congestion management, and developing transportation plans and documents.

Communities

Cities
 Nicholasville (county seat)
 Wilmore

Education
Jessamine County Schools provides public education|.

Elementary schools
 Brookside Elementary
 Jessamine Early Learning Village
 Nicholasville Elementary
 Red Oak Elementary
 Rosenwald-Dunbar Elementary
 Warner Elementary
 Wilmore Elementary

Middle schools
 East Jessamine Middle
 West Jessamine Middle

Middle/High School
 The Providence School

High schools
 East Jessamine High
 West Jessamine High
 Jessamine Career and Technology Center (JCTC)

Adult Education
 Jessamine County Adult Education

Post-secondary institutions
 Asbury University
 Asbury Theological Seminary

Unincorporated Communities

Census-designated place
 High Bridge

Other unincorporated places
 Brannon Woods
 Keene

Politics

See also

 Bethel Academy
 National Register of Historic Places listings in Jessamine County, Kentucky

References

External links
 Official website of Lexington Area Metropolitan Planning Organization
 Official website of Jessamine County
 Official website of Camp Nelson Civil War Historic Site
 Jessamine County Schools

 
Kentucky counties
Lexington–Fayette metropolitan area
1798 establishments in Kentucky
Populated places established in 1798